The Albany Empire are a professional indoor football team based in Albany, New York. They are members of the National Arena League since 2021 and play home games at MVP Arena. They are named after the defunct Arena Football League (AFL) team of the same name that won the last ArenaBowl before the AFL folded.

History
In August 2020, Albany was announced as a 2021 expansion team in the National Arena League (NAL) and later obtained the rights to use the name of a defunct Arena Football League (AFL) team, the Albany Empire. The team was owned by the same ownership group, including Ron Tridico and Nate Starling, as another NAL team that was named after a former AFL team, the Orlando Predators. Former AFL Empire head coach Rob Keefe was brought back as head coach along with former Jacksonville Sharks' head coach and Empire assistant head coach Les Moss as assistant head coach. However, by April 2021, both had left to join the Indoor Football League's Iowa Barnstormers, stating they did not have the same plans as the owners. The team's head coach during their inaugural season was Tom Menas, who led the Empire to a 7–1 record and an NAL championship.

In November 2021, Tridico's and Starling's majority ownership of the team was sold to local businessman Mike Kwarta, while Tridico and Starling retained a minority stake. In March 2023, former NFL wide receiver Antonio Brown joined the team as a part owner. His father Eddie Brown, a longtime member of the AFL's Albany Firebirds, also joined the organization as the Vice President of Football Operations and will be involved in the team’s day-to-day operations.

Season-by-season results

Current roster

References

External links
 Official website

National Arena League teams
American football teams established in 2020
2020 establishments in New York (state)
American football teams in New York (state)
Albany Empire (AFL)